The Writers Guild of America Award for Best Documentary Screenplay is one of three screenwriting Writers Guild of America Awards focused specifically for film. The award is presented to the best screenplay of the year for a documentary feature. It has been presented annually since the 57th Writers Guild of America Awards in 2005. Alex Gibney is the only person to win multiple awards, winning four. Gibney also holds the record for nominations with ten.

Winners and nominees

Notes
 The year indicates when the film was released. The awards are presented the following year.

2000s

2010s

2020s

Writers with multiple awards
4 awards
Alex Gibney
2 awards
Brett Morgen

Writers with multiple nominations

10 nominations
Alex Gibney

4 Nominations
Mark Monroe

3 nominations
Amy J. Berg
Michael Moore
Brett Morgen

2 nominations
Marshall Curry
Charles Ferguson
Lauren Greenfield
Bill Guttentag
Brian Knappenberger
Mark Monroe
Gabe Polsky
Kim Roberts
Dan Sturman

References

External links 
 

Documentary Screenplay
Awards established in 2005
American documentary film awards